Carnegie Library is located in Montclair, Essex County, New Jersey, United States. The building was built in 1904 and was added to the National Register of Historic Places on July 1, 1988.

See also
National Register of Historic Places listings in Essex County, New Jersey
List of Carnegie libraries in New Jersey
East Orange Public Library

References

Library buildings completed in 1904
Libraries on the National Register of Historic Places in New Jersey
Prairie School architecture in New Jersey
Buildings and structures in Essex County, New Jersey
Montclair, New Jersey
Carnegie libraries in New Jersey
National Register of Historic Places in Essex County, New Jersey
New Jersey Register of Historic Places